This list includes most of the more common plants to be found on the Modoc National Forest in California, USA as well as plants of some particular note, especially rare plants known or suspected to occur there. If you click on the genus, you will be taken to the page for the genus only; you must click on the specific epithet to be taken to the page for that particular species.

Bryophytes

Liverworts

Ptilidium californicum

Mosses

Bruchia bolanderi
Buxbaumia viridis
Helodium blandowii
Meesia triquetra
Meesia uliginosa

Ferns

Dennstaedtiaceae

Pteridium aquilinum

Dryopteridaceae

Athyrium filix-femina
Polystichum

Equisetaceae

Equisetum arvense
Equisetum hyemale

Marsileaceae

Marsilea
Pilularia

Ophioglossaceae

Botrychium pumicola

Pteridaceae

Cheilanthes
Pellaea

Conifers

Cupressaceae

Calocedrus decurrens
Cupressus bakeri -  Modoc Cypress or Baker Cypress
Juniperus communis
Juniperus occidentalis

Pinaceae

Abies concolor
Abies magnifica
Pinus albicaulis
Pinus attenuata
Pinus contorta
Pinus jeffreyi
Pinus lambertiana
Pinus monticola
Pinus ponderosa
Pseudotsuga menziesii
Tsuga mertensiana

Dicots

Amaranthaceae

Amaranthus californicus

Apiaceae

Berula
Cicuta douglasii
Conium maculatum
Eryngium
Heracleum maximum
Ligusticum
Lomatium bicolor
Lomatium dissectum
Lomatium macrocarpum
Lomatium nudicaule
Lomatium roseanum
Lomatium utriculatum
Osmorhiza
Sanicula

Apocynaceae

Apocynum androsaemifolium
Apocynum cannabinum

Asclepiadaceae

Asclepias

Asteraceae

Achillea millefolium
Ageratina
Antennaria
Arnica
Artemisia douglasiana
Artemisia tridentata
Bidens tripartita
Carduus nutans
Centaurea diffusa
Centaurea maculosa
Centaurea solstitialis
Chrysothamnus
Cirsium arvense
Cirsium occidentale
Cirsium vulgare
Crepis
Ericameria
Erigeron acris
Eriophyllum lanatum
Eurybia
Euthamia
Gnaphalium
Grindelia
Helianthus annuus
Hieracium albiflorum
Hymenoxys
Ionactis
Iva
Lactuca serriola
Leucanthemum vulgare
Madia
Microseris nutans
Onopordum acanthium
Packera
Senecio
Solidago canadensis
Sonchus
Stephanomeria
Symphyotrichum
Taraxacum officinale
Tragopogon dubius
Tragopogon porrifolius
Xanthium strumarium

Berberidaceae

Mahonia aquifolium
Mahonia nervosa
Mahonia repens

Boraginaceae

Amsinckia
Asperugo procumbens
Cryptantha
Hackelia
Heliotropium
Lithospermum
Mertensia

Brassicaceae

Alyssum
Arabis
Barbarea
Brassica rapa
Cardamine
Draba verna
Erysimum
Isatis tinctoria
Lepidium campestre
Lepidium virginicum
Nasturtium officinale
Phoenicaulis cheiranthoides
Polyctenium fremontii
Streptanthus
Thelypodium howellii

Callitrichaceae

Callitriche

Campanulaceae

Campanula
Downingia

Capparaceae

Cleome

Caprifoliaceae

Lonicera involucrata
Sambucus nigra
Symphoricarpos

Caryophyllaceae

Arenaria
Cerastium
Holosteum
Minuartia
Silene
Spergularia rubra
Stellaria media

Chenopodiaceae

Chenopodium
Salsola tragus

Clusiaceae

Hypericum perforatum

Convolvulaceae

Calystegia
Convolvulus arvensis

Cornaceae

Cornus sericea

Crassulaceae

Rhodiola
Sedum

Cuscutaceae

Cuscuta

Droseraceae

Drosera anglica
Drosera rotundifolia

Ericaceae

Arctostaphylos
Kalmia microphylla
Ledum
Vaccinium

Euphorbiaceae

Chamaesyce
Croton setigerus
Euphorbia

Fabaceae

Astragalus anxius — endemic & Critically Endangered
Astragalus inversus — endemic
Astragalus lemmonii
Lathyrus species
Lotus corniculatus
Lupinus latifolius var. barbatus
Lupinus polyphyllus
Medicago sativa
Melilotus officinalis
Robinia pseudoacacia
Thermopsis species
Trifolium pratense
Trifolium repens
Trifolium wormskioldii
Vicia species

Fagaceae

Chrysolepis
Quercus kelloggii

Fumariaceae

Dicentra

Garryaceae

Garrya

Gentianaceae

Centaurium
Gentiana

Geraniaceae

Erodium cicutarium
Geranium viscosissimum

Grossulariaceae

Ribes

Hippuridaceae

Hippuris vulgaris

Hydrophyllaceae

Hydrophyllum
Nama
Nemophila
Phacelia

Lamiaceae

Agastache
Lycopus
Marrubium vulgare
Mentha arvensis
Monardella odoratissima
Prunella
Salvia
Scutellaria
Stachys ajugoides
Trichostema lanceolatum

Lentibulariaceae

Utricularia vulgaris

Linaceae

Linum lewisii

Loasaceae

Mentzelia

Lythraceae

Lythrum

Malvaceae

Iliamna
Sidalcea

Menyanthaceae

Menyanthes trifoliata

Monotropaceae

Allotropa virgata
Monotropa hypopithys
Pterospora andromedea

Oleaceae

Fraxinus latifolia

Onagraceae

Camissonia
Chamerion angustifolium
Circaea
Clarkia
Epilobium minutum

Orobanchaceae

Orobanche

Paeoniaceae

Paeonia brownii

Papaveraceae

Eschscholzia californica

Polemoniaceae

Collomia
Gilia
Ipomopsis aggregata
Linanthus
Phlox stansburyi
Phlox hoodii var. canescens
Polemonium

Polygonaceae

Eriogonum nudum
Oxyria digyna
Polygonum arenastrum
Rumex acetosella
Rumex aquaticus
Rumex crispus

Portulacaceae

Calandrinia
Claytonia perfoliata
Lewisia rediviva

Primulaceae

Dodecatheon

Pyrolaceae

Chimaphila umbellata
Pyrola asarifolia

Ranunculaceae

Aconitum
Actaea rubra
Adonis aestivalis
Anemone
Aquilegia formosa
Caltha
Delphinium
Enemion stipitatum
Myosurus
Pulsatilla
Ranunculus aquatilis
Ranunculus glaberrimus
Ranunculus testiculatus
Thalictrum

Rhamnaceae

Ceanothus
Frangula
Rhamnus

Rosaceae

Amelanchier alnifolia
Cercocarpus ledifolius
Chamaebatiaria millefolium
Comarum palustre
Crataegus
Fragaria virginiana
Geum aleppicum
Geum macrophyllum
Holodiscus discolor
Malus pumila
Peraphyllum ramosissimum
Potentilla fruticosa
Prunus emarginata
Prunus subcordata
Prunus virginiana
Purshia tridentata
Rosa
Rubus leucodermis
Sanguisorba
Sorbus
Spiraea douglasii

Rubiaceae

Galium aparine
Galium triflorum

Salicaceae

Populus alba
Populus tremuloides
Salix alba

Saxifragaceae

Heuchera
Parnassia
Saxifraga

Scrophulariaceae

Castilleja
Collinsia
Cordylanthus capitatus
Linaria
Mimulus guttatus
Pedicularis
Penstemon
Scrophularia
Verbascum thapsus
Veronica americana

Solanaceae

Nicotiana
Solanum physalifolium

Urticaceae

Urtica dioica

Valerianaceae

Valeriana

Violaceae

Viola beckwithii

Viscaceae

Arceuthobium

Zygophyllaceae

Tribulus terrestris

Monocots

Asparagaceae

Camassia quamash

Alliaceae

Allium validum

Alismataceae

Damasonium
Sagittaria

Cyperaceae

Carex
Eleocharis bella
Eriophorum
Schoenoplectus acutus
Scirpus

Iridaceae

Iris
Olsynium douglasii

Juncaceae

Juncus tenuis
Luzula

Liliaceae

Calochortus
Fritillaria pudica
Lilium pardalinum

Melanthiaceae

Toxicoscordion venenosum
Veratrum

Orchidaceae

Cephalanthera
Corallorhiza maculata
Cypripedium montanum
Goodyera
Piperia
Platanthera
Spiranthes

Poaceae

Achnatherum
Agropyron desertorum
Agrostis stolonifera
Alopecurus pratensis
Arrhenatherum elatius
Beckmannia
Briza
Briza maxima
Bromus tectorum
Calamagrostis
Cinna
Crypsis
Dactylis glomerata
Danthonia
Deschampsia
Distichlis spicata
Echinochloa crus-galli
Elymus repens
Festuca
Glyceria
Hesperostipa
Hordeum jubatum
Koeleria
Leymus
Melica
Muhlenbergia
Orcuttia tenuis
Phalaris arundinacea
Phleum pratense
Poa palustris
Poa pratensis
Taeniatherum caput-medusae
Trisetum
Vulpia

Potamogetonaceae

Potamogeton

Ruscaceae

Maianthemum racemosum

Sparganiaceae

Sparganium

Themidaceae

Brodiaea
Dichelostemma
Triteleia

Typhaceae

Typha latifolia

See also

 — with flora articles.

References
Modoc National Forest;gov: Nature & Science
Modoc National Forest Botany Program — Summer botany work

External links
Selected Wildflowers of the Modoc National Forest — descriptive text + images.
Modoc National Forest-MNF — Nature Viewing: Viewing Plants — links to "Viewing Plants Areas" in the MNF.

Modoc
Plants
Modoc
Modoc Plateau
Natural history of Modoc County, California
Natural history of Siskiyou County, California
Natural history of Lassen County, California